Hypotrix parallela is a moth of the family Noctuidae. It is found from south-western Colorado, southward through eastern Arizona, New Mexico, and western Texas to the State of Durango in northern Mexico.

The wingspan is about 30 mm.

Most records are from in ponderosa pine parkland.

Adults are on wing from early July to late August.

External links
A revision of the genus Hypotrix Guenée in North America with descriptions of four new species and a new genus (Lepidoptera, Noctuidae, Noctuinae, Eriopygini)
Images

Hypotrix
Moths described in 1883